The North Dakota Democratic Party was a political party in North Dakota that existed from the state's formation in 1889 until 1956, when the party merged with the Non Partisan League to form the modern North Dakota Democratic NPL Party.

For most of its history until its merger with the NPL, the Democratic Party was a distant competitor for votes; between the founding of the state and 1956, just 3 out of 24 governors: John Burke (1907–1913), Thomas H. Moodie (1935), and John Moses (1937–1945) were Democrats.

See also
Politics of North Dakota
Political party strength in North Dakota

Notes

Political parties established in 1889
History of North Dakota
Political parties in North Dakota
Political parties disestablished in 1956
1889 establishments in North Dakota
1956 disestablishments in North Dakota